The 116th Mahrattas were an infantry regiment of the British Indian Army. The regiment traces their origins to 1800, when they were raised as the 2nd Battalion, 7th Regiment of Bombay Native Infantry.

During World War I the regiment was attached to the 18th Indian Division for the Mesopotamia Campaign.  They were involved in the  Actions at the Fat-ha Gorge and on the Little Zab and the Battle of Sharqat in October 1918.

After World War I the Indian government reformed the army moving from single battalion regiments to multi battalion regiments. In 1922, the 116th Mahrattas became the 4th Battalion 5th Mahratta Light Infantry. After independence they were one of the regiments allocated to the Indian Army.

Predecessor names 
2nd Battalion, 8th Regiment of Bombay Native Infantry - 1800
16th Bombay Native Infantry - 1824
16th Bombay Infantry - 1885
116th Mahrattas - 1903

References

Sources

British Indian Army infantry regiments
Bombay Presidency
Military units and formations established in 1800
Military units and formations disestablished in 1922